Pyrgocythara turrispiralata is an extinct species of sea snail, a marine gastropod mollusc in the family Mangeliidae.

Description
The length of the shell attains 6.3 mm, its diameter 2.9 mm.

Distribution
Fossils of this marine species were found in Miocene strata of Ukraine; age range: 13.65 to 11.608 Ma

References

 D. Scarpioni, G. Dellabella, B. Dell’Angelo, J.W. Huntley, and M. Sosso. 2016. Middle Miocene conoidean gastropods from western Ukraine (Paratethys): Integrative taxonomy, palaeo-climatogical and palaeobiogeographical implications. Acta Palaeontologica Polonica 61(2):327–344

External links
 Fossilsworks : † Pyrgocythara turrispiralata Woodring 1928

turrispiralata
Gastropods described in 2016